Polygyra is a genus of air-breathing land snails, terrestrial pulmonate gastropod mollusks in the family Polygyridae.

The two-IUCN listed taxa, Polygyra hippocrepis and Polygyra peregrina, are now usually named Daedalochila hippocrepis and Millerelix peregrina.

Species
Species and subspecies in the genus Polygyra:
 Polygyra cereolus
 Polygyra cereolus floridana
 Polygyra septemvolva
 Polygyra septemvolva febigeri
 Polygyra septemvolva volvoxis

References

Polygyridae
Taxonomy articles created by Polbot